Maurice Julius Dallard (May 6, 1899 – November 26, 1933), nicknamed "Eggie", was an American Negro league first baseman in the 1920s and 1930s.

A native of Winslow, New Jersey, Dallard made his Negro leagues debut in 1921 with the Hilldale Club. He went on to play for several teams, including the Washington/Wilmington Potomacs and Baltimore Black Sox, and finished his career in 1933 with the Philadelphia Stars. Dallard died in Philadelphia, Pennsylvania in 1933 at age 34.

References

External links
 and Baseball-Reference Black Baseball stats and Seamheads

1899 births
1933 deaths
Bacharach Giants players
Baltimore Black Sox players
Hilldale Club players
Philadelphia Stars players
Washington Potomacs players
Wilmington Potomacs players
Baseball first basemen
Baseball players from New Jersey
People from Winslow Township, New Jersey
20th-century African-American sportspeople
Road incident deaths in Pennsylvania